Phoma destructiva is a fungal plant pathogen infecting tomatoes and potatoes.

References

External links 
 Index Fungorum
 USDA ARS Fungal Database

Fungal plant pathogens and diseases
Potato diseases
Tomato diseases
destructiva
Fungi described in 1881